Romanticize is the second and final full-length studio album by the South Korean boyband NU'EST, released on April 19, 2021. This is NU'EST's first Korean full-length album since 2014's Re:Birth. The album has 10 tracks including the lead single "Inside Out".

Commercial performance 
Romanticize debuted and charted at number 6 on the Gaon Album Chart in the month of April, selling over 206,188 copies. The album also gained the third highest first week sales in the month of April.

Track listing

Charts

Weekly charts

Year-end charts

Accolades

Music programs awards

References

2021 albums
Korean-language albums
NU'EST albums
Hybe Corporation albums